Tourism in Myanmar (also known as Burma) is a developing sector. As at February 2022, new tourist visa applications continue to be suspended. Although Myanmar possesses tourist potential, much of the industry remains to be developed. The number of visitors to Burma is small compared to its neighbouring countries. This is primarily due to its political situation. However, after the junta transferred power to the civilian government, the tourism sector saw an increase in tourism arrivals, and in 2012, tourist arrivals surpassed the one million mark for the first time. In 2013, the Tourism Master Plan was created, targeting 7.5 million arrivals by 2020.

Tourism has been developed mainly by Myanmar's government, which has encouraged tourism since 1992. Private enterprises also exist, catering to a wide range of tourists.

In 2010, 791,505 foreign tourists visited Myanmar, with 295,174 foreign tourists entering the country via Yangon International Airport. By 2012, more than 1 million foreign tourists visited Myanmar. In 2013, the number of foreign arrivals reached more than 2.04 million, counting both air and overland arrivals.

Tourism has been promoted by advocacy groups as a method of providing economic benefit to Burmese civilians, and to avoid isolating the country from the rest of the world. Voices for Burma, a pro-democracy advocate group, states, "We believe that small-scale, responsible tourism can create more benefits than harm. So long as tourists are fully aware of the situation and take steps to maximise their positive impact and minimise the negatives, we feel their visit can be beneficial overall. Responsible tourists can help Burma primarily by bringing money to local communities and small businesses, and by raising awareness of the situation worldwide."

A former Burmese tourism minister estimated that 12% of the government revenues are derived from tourism, with the tourism industry contributing $182 million USD (2007) to the government's annual budget.

Statistics
In the 2010-2011 fiscal year, tourists comprised 73.84% (313,127 arrivals) of overseas visitors, primarily entering the country by air, representing 69.26% of arrivals, followed by land and sea, which represented 29.97% and 0.77% of arrivals respectively. An additional 110,914 visitors arrived through other visa types and represented an additional 26.16% of the total. In 2012, revenues from tourism jumped to over $534 million in 2012, up from $315 million in 2011.

General trends
Tourist arrivals to Yangon Entry Point, Mandalay & Bagan Gateways, Nay Pyi Taw Gateway and Border Tourism.

Tourists by nationality
The governmental statistics body, the Central Statistical Organization, reported more than 3,000,000 travellers flocked to Myanmar in 2014, compared with approximately 816,000 visitors in 2011. Among these, 1,022,081 tourist arrivals (excluding visitors under special entry visas such as social or business visas) were via Yangon International Airport.

Most visitors arriving to Myanmar on short term basis were from the following countries of nationality:

Tourist attractions

The most popular available tourist destinations in Myanmar include big cities such as Yangon and Mandalay; religious sites in Mon State, Pindaya, Bago and Hpa-An; nature trails in Inle Lake, Kalaw, Kengtung, Putao, Pyin Oo Lwin; ancient cities such as Bagan and Mrauk-U; as well as beaches in Nabule Ngapali, Maungmagan Ngwe-Saung, Mergui.

Kachin State
 Myitkyina
 Putao
 Bamho
 Hugaung Plain

Yangon
 Yangon
 Shwedagon Pagoda

Mandalay
 Mandalay
 Bagan
 Ava
 Amarapura
 Pyin U Lwin
 Mount Popa

Mon State
 Kyaiktiyo Pagoda
 Mudon (the world's largest reclining Buddha)
 Mawlamyine
Thanbyuzayat (WWII Death Railway)

Rakhine State
 Mrauk U
 Ngapali Beach

Shan State
 Inle Lake
 Taunggyi
Kalaw
Pindaya

Other beaches
 Chaungtha
 Ngwesaung

Ecotourism
 Myeik Archipelago
 Hukawng Valley
 Hkakabo Razi
 Alaungdaw Kathapa National Park
 Popa Mountain National Park
 Mount Victoria National Park

UNESCO World Heritage Sites in Myanmar

Tentative list to be added

Historical Politics

In May 2011, Aung San Suu Kyi and her party National League for Democracy expressed the opinion that responsible tourism to Burma should be encouraged. Other pro-democracy activists, such as Ma Thanegi, advocated small scale tourism, and careful spending. Tourists are welcome to Burma provided they are "keen to promote the welfare of the common people and the conservation of the environment and to acquire an insight into the cultural, political and social life of the country while enjoying a happy and fulfilling holiday in Burma." In their official statement they request not only the development of the people's livelihood but also the promotion of "self respect and self-reliance in the people."

See also
 Visa policy of Burma
 List of museums in Burma
 Community Based Tourism in Myanmar

References

External links

 Ministry of Hotels and Tourism

 Myanmar/Burma at Lonely Planet